Kaikaram is one of the major panchayats in the Unguturu mandal of  West Godavari district, Andhra Pradesh, India.
Kaikaram (KKRM) has its own train station connecting to major cities.

Demographics 

 Census of India, Kaikaram had a population of 9532. The total population constitute, 4778 males and 4754 females with a sex ratio of 995 females per 1000 males. 934 children are in the age group of 0–6 years, with sex ratio of 987. The average literacy rate stands at 72.78%.

References

Villages in West Godavari district